The 19th International 500-Mile Sweepstakes Race was held at the Indianapolis Motor Speedway on Saturday, May 30, 1931. Race winner Louis Schneider, who led the final 34 laps, was accompanied by riding mechanic Jigger Johnson.

The start of the race was delayed two hours due to rain. Defending race winner Billy Arnold charged from 18th starting position to lead the race by lap 7. Arnold, who had dominated the 1930 race (led 198 laps), proceeded to lead the next 155 laps, and built up a five-lap lead over second place. His rear axle broke on lap 162. He spun in turn four, was hit by another car, driven by Luther Johnson, and went over the outside wall. One of his errant wheels bounced across Georgetown Road, and struck and killed an 11-year-old boy, Wilbur C. Brink. Arnold suffered a broken pelvis, and his riding mechanic, Spider Matlock, broke his shoulder.

The race was part of the 1931 AAA Championship Car season.

Race schedule

Practice – Week 1
The deadline for entries to be received was midnight on Friday May 1. A record 72 cars were entered, for 40 starting positions. The track was made available for practice at the beginning of the month, and most entries were expected to arrive mid-month.

Tuesday May 5: A total of seven complete cars had arrived to the garage area. Tony Gulotta was one of few cars to take to the track during the first few days, turning in laps around 100 mph.
Thursday May 7: breakups in the track surface were being repaired. Floyd "Sparky" Sparks practiced during the repair work, turning laps around 75-80 mph.

By the end of the first full week of practice, track activity had been sparse. Several of the top teams were expected to arrive within the next week. In addition, rain and cold weather kept drivers off the track over the weekend and into Monday.

Practice – Week 2
Tuesday May 12: Joe Russo, Jerry Houck, and L. L. Corum, were among at least four cars that took practice laps. Houck lost a wheel on the backstretch, but suffered no other damage to the car.
Wednesday May 13: Track activity picked up in earnest on Wednesday, owing much to the fair weather. Leon Duray took to the track for the first time in his supercharged two-cycle, 16-cylinder, Stutz Bearcat, after much anticipation. But Duray suffered a stuck piston, sometime after running a lap of 112 mph. Other drivers taking laps included Tony Gulotta (103 mph) and Phil Pardee (90 mph). Billy Arnold and Harry Hartz took turns in Arnold's car, with laps reported in the 109-110 mph range. Joe Russo, repeating a stunt he performed a year earlier, took a lap around the Speedway blindfolded.
Thursday May 14: Billy Arnold turned the fastest practice lap of the month at 110 mph. Owner Harry Hartz also took some test laps in Arnold's car. Russ Snowberger was the second-fastest of the day, clocking in at 106 mph. Other drivers on the track included, Ernie Triplett (103 mph), Buddy Marr (100 mph), L. L. Corum (93 mph), Joe Caccia (96 mph), Tony Gulotta, Howard Seecomb, and Phil Pardee. Louis Schneider took some initial laps with his riding mechanic Jigger Johnson, but an oil leak persisted. Johnson tried to plug the hole with his fingers, so the pair could complete at least a handful of laps, to no avail.
Friday May 15: Stubby Stubblefield (109 mph) led the practice speeds on a fairly light day of track activity. Ernie Triplett (109 mph), Chet Miller (100 mph), L. L. Corum (94 mph), and Jerry Houck (over 90 mph), were among others that took to the track. Some participants left the grounds to attend the Kentucky Derby.
Saturday May 16: Louis Meyer ran his first laps of the month in the 16-cylinder Sampson Special. Meyer completed a lap of 113.63 mph. Milton Jones fishtailed his car exiting turn three, and made contact with the inside wall. The cars was expected to be repaired.

Practice – Week 3
Sunday May 17: Cliff Durant took laps in Leon Duray's supercharged 16-cylinder car, hitting top speeds of 125 mph on the straights. The car, which had been suffering from overheating problems for the past few days, blew the top off the radiator. The team went to work to install a new radiator and water pump in time for qualifying. Louis Schneider and Tony Gulotta were both over 103 mph, while Joe Russo, and Chet Miller both hit laps of 100 mph. L. L. Corum (96 mph) was steadily increasing his speed as the days passed.
Monday May 18: Cliff Durant was forced to fly to Michigan to tend to urgent business, leaving Leon Duray as the driver remaining behind to qualify their supercharged 16-cylinder machine. The team was still waiting for a replacement radiator from Detroit. Durant was expected to return and drive relief in the race if needed. Cliff Bergere was named to the Elco Royale entry, having tested it at around 102-104 mph. Babe Stapp also arrived at the track.
Tuesday May 19: By Tuesday, at least 30 cars had arrived at the track. Arriving at the track were car builder Harry Miller and car owner William S. White. Their two cars, a 301-cubic inch, 16-cylinder machine to be driven by Shorty Cantlon, and a four-cylinder for Bert Karnatz, were en route from Los Angeles, expected for delivery on Wednesday. Miller and White kept the details of the much-anticipated 16-cylinder machine guarded. Of the cars on the track, Lou Moore in the twin 4-cylinder Coleman Special, raised eyebrows with a 104 mph lap.
Wednesday May 20: Track activity was bustling by Wednesday, with many cars, mechanics, and representatives in the garage area. Russ Snowberger got some attention after he turned a lap of 113 mph in his nearly-stock motor Studebaker. Also fast for the day was Ernie Triplett (111 mph). The Bill White/Harry Miller 16-cylinder car was delivered to the track at noontime, and driver Shorty Cantlon immediately took to the track for some shakedown laps.
Thursday May 21: One day after arriving at the track, Shorty Cantlon's Bill White/Harry Miller 16-cylinder machine broke a connecting rod and blew a hole in the crankcase. The catastrophic engine failure was traced to an error during assembly. Cantlon was out of contention for the pole position, and now had to wait for replacement parts and an engine rebuild. Also on the sidelines was Leon Duray, still waiting for delivery of a replacement radiator for the Durant 16-cylinder machine. At about 5 p.m., the steering failed on Frank Brisko's car, causing him to lose control in turn 4 and hit the inside wall. The car then rebounded and hit the outside wall, coming to rest in the middle of the track. The car suffered heavy damage to the front end and front axle. Brisko and his riding mechanic Fred Winnai were not seriously injured, and planned to make repairs.
Friday May 22: The much-anticipated and much-talked about Cummins Diesel Special, entered by Clessie Cummins, arrived at the Speedway on Friday. Dave Evans took the diesel to the track and ran off laps of about 96-97 mph. Earlier in the month, officials had announced a special exemption rule for diesel-powered entries, to encourage their participation. Any diesel that completed the four-lap qualifying attempt in excess of 80 mph average, would qualify for the field, regardless of overall speed rank. The other gasoline-powered engines had a minimum speed of 90 mph in time trials.

Time trials

Four-lap (10 mile) qualifying runs were utilized, with 90 mph set as the required minimum speed. Diesel entries were allowed a special rules exception, given them a guaranteed starting position provided they complete their run at a speed of greater than 80 mph. Riding mechanics were required to accompany the drivers on all cars during qualifying.

Saturday May 23
The first day of time trials was held Saturday May 23, with the track available for qualifying from 10:00 a.m. to 7:01 p.m. (sundown). The minimum qualifying speed for gasoline powered engines was set at 90 mph. Dave Evans was the first car out to qualify, in the Cummins Diesel Special. Evans completed his run at 96.871 mph, well above the 80 mph minimum speed required for diesel-powered entries.

Russ Snowberger won the pole position with a four-lap average speed of 112.796 mph. A total of 19 cars took to the track, but only 17 cars officially qualified. Rounding out the front row was Bill Cummings and first year driver Paul Bost. Snowberger winning the pole was a surprise, not only because his nearly-stock motor Studebaker outperformed Cummings and others, but three of the favorites for the pole did not even get to put in a time. Cummings first attempt early in the day started out with a lap of 115.001 mph, but he suffered a failed clutch. Cumming's second attempt run managed only a 112.563 mph, just 0.66 seconds shy of bumping Snowberger from the pole.

Shorty Cantlon was kept off the track for the whole weekend, still awaiting an engine rebuild. He was expected to qualify on Tuesday. Louis Meyer, another favorite, took to the track to make an attempt in the 16-cylinder Sampson Special. He came down the mainstretch, but lost control in turn one, brushing the inside and outside wall. He drove back to the pits with a bent frame, and would be forced to make repairs.

Defending pole position and race winner Billy Arnold was having trouble finding speed over the past couple of days, but scrambled to make an attempt late in the day on Saturday. He wheeled to the line at 7:08 p.m., past the deadline for the track to close. Officials decided to allow the run, and his four-lap average of 113.848 mph tentatively took the pole position. After the run, some drivers protested, and during a post-qualifying inspection, it was found that Arnold's brake cables were not connected. During the rush to get the car on the track, the crew had neglected to connect the brake cables, and technical committee chairman Louis H. Schwitzer disallowed the run.

* Disqualified

Source: The Indianapolis News

Sunday May 24
The second day of time trials was held on Sunday May 24. The track was for available for qualifying from 1 p.m. to 7:01 p.m. (sundown). Only two cars completed qualifying runs. One day after having his run disallowed, Billy Arnold put his car in the field at 116.080 mph. he became the fastest qualifier in the field.

During a practice run, the car of Floyd "Sparky" Sparks caught on fire down the backstretch, ignited from an oil or gasoline leak. Attempting to close off the fuel line, he hit the retaining wall in turn three. The car was badly burned. Sparks would not be able to qualify.

Tony Gulotta was the only other driver to complete a qualifying attempt. Gulotta left the Bowes Seal Fast team and instead moved over to the Hunt Special entered by Ab Jenkins. Freddy Winnai took his old seat. Gulotta would have been fast enough for the second row, but as a second day qualifier, he would line up 19th on the grid. Lou Moore tried to qualify Pete DePaolo's Boyle Valve Special, but a broken clutch prevented the attempt. At the end of the day, the field was filled to 19 cars, with 21 spots remaining.

Source: The Indianapolis News

Monday May 25
The third day of qualifying was held Monday May 25, with the track available from 2 p.m. to 7:02 p.m. (sundown). The day was marred by the fatal accident of Joe Caccia and his riding mechanic Clarence Grover. Caccia was on the track in the morning for a practice run, when the car skidded out of control entering turn 2. The car slid about 150 feet, and then slid into the outside barrier. The car ripped a hole through the outside retaining wall, hurtled 100 feet down the embankment, and crashed into a tree. Both drivers were likely thrown from the car, landed next to it, and the car had burst into flames. Both drivers were killed instantly, and were enveloped by the flames.

Five cars completed qualification runs, filling the field to 24 cars. Jimmy Gleason (111.400 mph) was the fastest car of the day. Frank Farmer, formerly of the M.A. Yagle entry, took over the Jones-Miller Special, and was the second-fastest car of the day.

Still yet to qualify was Shorty Cantlon, who practiced unofficially over 118 mph, but suffered a broken universal joint during the day.

Source: The Indianapolis News

Tuesday May 26
The fourth day of qualifying was held Tuesday May 26, with the track available from 2 p.m. to 7:02 p.m. (sundown). Nine cars completed runs, led by Lou Meyer in the Samson Special. Meyer was qualified comfortably, though probably below his potential speed, said to be playing it safe after his crash on Saturday. After considerable delay, Shorty Cantlon put his 16-cylinder machine in the field, as did Leon Duray. Duray had been suffering from overheating issues all week, and observers noted he qualified with water boiling from the radiator, indicating the problems were still not solved.

Source: The Indianapolis News

Wednesday May 27
The final day of qualifying was held Wednesday May 26, with the track available from 2 p.m. to 7:04 p.m. (sundown). The day opening with seven spots remaining in the grid. Out of a total of 72 entries, upwards of twenty cars were considered available for time trials.

During a busy day of track activity, a total of eight cars qualified for the starting field, filling the grid to 40 cars. At least twelve other cars attempted to qualify, but were too slow or failed to complete their run. The fastest car of the day was Gene Haustein (107.823 mph), followed by Myron Stevens.

Car owner Fred Clemmons managed to get both of his Hoosier Pete entries qualified, despite the cars only arriving at the track for the first time Wednesday morning. Billy Winn and Herman Schurch both took to the track for shake down laps at slow speed, and practiced for only about 45 minutes. The cars were brought to the garage for adjustments to the springs and shock absorbers, and later in the afternoon were safely qualified to the grid with only about 20 laps of practice each.

Wilbur Shaw and Ralph DePalma were both at the track Wednesday, looking to qualify. Officials deemed that DePalma had not arrived in enough time to qualify, and the car he was to drive had not shown sufficient speed. Shaw took to the track for a qualifying attempt late in the day, but he pulled off with a broken crankshaft before starting the run.

With less than fifteen minutes remaining in the day, Joe Huff was the final qualifier. Huff would have "crowded out" Harry Butcher, the slowest qualifier. After qualifying was over, however, Peter Kreis in the Coleman Special withdrew due to handling problems. As a result, Harry Butcher in the Butcher Brothers Special was restored to the starting field.

The track was to be available on Thursday for final "carburation tests." No track activity was scheduled for Friday.

Source: The Indianapolis News

Starting grid

Alternates
First alternate: Ted Chamberlain

Failed to qualify

Peter Kreis (withdrew)
Rick Decker (bumped)
Bill Denver (bumped)
Lora L. Corum (too slow; drove relief during the race)
C.C. Reeder (too slow)
Joe Thomas (too slow)
Ben Brandfon (too slow)
Bert Karnatz (incomplete attempt)
Malcolm Fox (incomplete attempt)
James Patterson (incomplete attempt)
Marion Trexler (incomplete attempt)
Gordon Condon (incomplete attempt)
Wilbur Shaw (incomplete attempt; drove relief during race)
Joe Caccia (fatal practice crash)
Wesley Crawford
Harry Miller
Bryan Saulpaugh
Eddie Burbach
Ralph DePalma (insufficient speed)
Dusty Fahrnow
Norske Larson
Charles Moran
Milt Marion
Rollin May
Zeke Meyer
Wally Zale
Roy Painter
Carl Smith
Floyd "Sparky" Sparks (car fire)
Johnny Seymour
Ab Jenkins (illness)
Jerry Houck
Milton Jones
Peter DePaolo

Race recap

Start
Overnight and morning rain delayed the start from 10:00 a.m. to 12 p.m. The Indianapolis Drum and Bugle Corps. paraded and entertained the early arriving fans, including Governor Harry G. Leslie and his entourage of seven other state governors. At noon, pace car driver Willard "Big Boy" Rader guided the field in the Cadillac 370 V-12 pace car for one unscored pace lap. Speedway general manager Theodore E. Meyers rode as a passenger. Rader and Meyers pulled over on the mainstretch, and the green flag was displayed for the flying start. The race began with Paul Bost grabbing the lead from the outside of the front row. Bost led the first two laps. Bill Cummings took the lead for laps 3–6.

Defending winner Billy Arnold, who started 18th (and was the fastest qualifier), went on a tear through the field at the start. He passed 17 cars, and took the lead on lap 7. He picked up where he left off a year earlier, and started pulling out to about a 15-second lead.

After suffering constant overheating problems during practice and time trials, Leon Duray pitted his car after only six laps. The overheating problems persisted and he finished 37th.

First half
On lap 33, rain returned to the area, and brought out the yellow flag. The race was slowed and run under the yellow flag for about the next 28 laps. Drivers were required to slow down to about an 80 mph pace, and passing was not allowed unless except those cars that entered the pit area.

The drizzling stopped, and the green flag came back out on the 61st lap. Only a few laps later, the yellow flag came out again when Wilbur Shaw (driving relief for Phil Pardee) wrecked spectacularly in turn three. The car leaped over the outside wall, and down the embankment. Shaw was uninjured, and walked back to the pits, ready to relieve another driver. While the crash was being cleaned up, more rain began to fall, and the yellow remained out for several minutes more.

By lap 70, the rain had stopped and the green flag was back out with Billy Arnold still leading. Ralph Hepburn was running second, Tony Gulotta third, Russ Snowberger fourth, and Fred Frame fifth. Bill Cummings dropped out after completing 70 laps due to an oil leak. On lap 94, Cummins took over the car of Deacon Litz. Also dropping out early with an oil leak was Louis Meyer (28 laps). He got back in the race on lap 73, taking over as relief for Myron Stevens.

Billy Arnold continued to lead at the halfway point.

Second half
Louis Schneider made his first and only pit stop on lap 106, taking on gasoline and oil, as well as changing the right rear tire. After surviving a spectacular crash in the first half, Wilbur Shaw was back in the race on lap 118, this time driving a stint of relief for Jimmy Gleason.

After leading 155 laps, Billy Arnold crashed on lap 162. In turn four, Arnold spun, and lost a wheel. He was hit by the car of Luther Johnson. Arnold's car burst into flames, and hit the concrete wall. It slid for about 200 feet, and Arnold and his riding mechanic Spider Matlock were thrown from the machine. A wheel from Arnold's wrecked car bounced over the wall and across the street, striking and killing an 11-year-old boy playing in his yard. Johnson's car flipped over, but he was not seriously injured.

Louis Schneider took the lead after Arnold's crash. Five laps later Tony Gulotta crashed in nearly the same spot as Arnold. Gulotta's car slid into the inside wall, then bounced up to the outside guardrail, ripping a portion of the barrier out, Neither Gulotta nor his riding mechanic were seriously injured.

With 30 laps to go, Schneider and second place Bill Cummings were nose-to-tail, battling for the lead. Cummings had taken over the car of Deacon Litz. Cummings hit the wall in the south short chute on lap 177, leaving Schneider all alone out in front. Schneider led the final 39 laps en route to victory, and won by 43.19 seconds over second place Fred Frame. At the time, it was the second-closest margin of victory in Indianapolis 500 history.

Polesitter Russ Snowberger was one of three drivers in the top five to complete the race without relief help. The car of Myron Stevens, with Louis Meyer driving relief for most of the race, charged from 35th starting position to 4th place, a remarkable gain of 31 positions at the finish.

Box score

Race details
For 1931, riding mechanics were required.
Dave Evans drove the Cummins Diesel Special entered by Clessie Cummins. During time trials, a special exception rule was made for diesel-powered engines which stated that if a diesel entry completed the four-lap qualifying run in excess of 80 mph average, it would qualify for the field, regardless of overall speed rank. Evans qualified at over 96 mph, but ranked 43rd overall. Evans was given the 40th and last starting position. On race day he finished 13th, performing the remarkable feat of completed the entire 500 miles without a pit stop. At some point during the race, Evans and his riding mechanic Thane Houser noticed that the water temperature was running high. Houser signaled back to the pit area, but Jimmy Doolittle who was working as the pit communicator, could not understand the message. Doolittle had misplaced a piece of paper which contained the key to the hand signals. Evans continued, having received no instruction from the pit area. After the race, Doolittle found the paper stuffed in his belt of his coat.

Notes

See also
1931 AAA Championship Car season

Works cited
Indianapolis 500 Historical Stats: 1931
ChampCarStats.com - 1931 International 500 Mile Sweepstakes
Hear the Indianapolis 500 As it Sounded 84 Years Ago

References

Indianapolis 500 races
Indianapolis 500
Indianapolis 500
1931 in American motorsport